Neomysis (from the Greek affix neo-, "new", and the genus name Mysis) is a genus of opossum shrimp (mysid crustacean) from the family Mysidae, distributed in the coastal zone of temperate seas of the Northern Hemisphere and South America. Several species, particularly from the West Pacific, are also found in fresh and brackish waters. The genus contains the following 18 species:

Neomysis americana (S. I. Smith, 1873)
Neomysis awatschensis (Brandt, 1851)
Neomysis czerniawskii Derzhavin, 1913
Neomysis ilyapai Holmquist, 1957
Neomysis integer (Leach, 1814)
Neomysis intermedia (Czerniavsky, 1882)
Neomysis japonica Nakazawa, 1910
Neomysis kadiakensis Ortmann, 1908
Neomysis mercedis Holmes, 1896
Neomysis meridionalis Colosi, 1924
Neomysis mirabilis (Czerniavsky, 1882)
Neomysis monticellii Colosi, 1924
Neomysis nakazawai Ii, 1936
Neomysis orientalis Ii, 1964
Neomysis patagona Zimmer, 1907
Neomysis rayii (Murdoch, 1885)
Neomysis sopayi Holmquist, 1957
Neomysis spinosa Nakazawa, 1910

References

Mysida
Malacostraca genera